Wild Iris is a 2001 drama television film directed by Daniel Petrie and starring Laura Linney, Gena Rowlands, Emile Hirsch, and Fred Ward, with Miguel Sandoval, Scott Gibson, and Lee Tergesen in supporting roles. The screenplay was by Kent Broadhurst. It was presented on Showtime.

Cast

 Gena Rowlands as Minnie Brinn
 Laura Linney as Iris Bravard
 Emile Hirsch as Lonnie Bravard
 Fred Ward as Errol Podubney
 Lee Tergesen as Lud van Eppy
 Miguel Sandoval as Ramando Galvez
 Scott Gibson as Ronnie Dale Bravard
 Amy Stewart as Rhondlyn Podubney

Accolades
Laura Linney won the Emmy Award for Outstanding Lead Actress in a Miniseries or Movie. Gena Rowlands was also nominated for the same award. In addition, Wild Iris received a 2002 PRISM Award for TV Movies and Miniseries, 2002 Aurora Gold Award for excellence, and was nominated for the Golden Satellite Awards 2002 for Best Motion Picture Made for Television.

References

External links
 IMDB Profile

2001 films
2001 drama films
2001 television films
American drama television films
Films directed by Daniel Petrie
Films produced by Gary Lucchesi
Films scored by Laurence Rosenthal
2000s English-language films
2000s American films